Laurens ten Dam (born 13 November 1980) is a Dutch former road racing cyclist and current gravel racer.

Career 
A native of the village of Zuidwolde in Groningen, Ten Dam started racing in 2000. A decent climber, Ten Dam was able to finish in the top ten in many important stage races including the 2007 Volta a Catalunya, the 2011 Tour Down Under, the 2011 Tour of California, and the 2011 Tour de Suisse. He also recorded two top ten finishes in Grand Tours: he finished 8th in the 2012 Vuelta a España and 9th in the 2014 Tour de France, and won the mountains classification in the 2009 Tour de Romandie.

Rabobank (2008–2015)
In 2012, Ten Dam finished 8th in the Vuelta a España, his best grand tour finish.

In the 2013 Tour de France, Ten Dam had an excellent first two weeks of the Tour, sitting 5th overall after the end of the second week with his teammate, Bauke Mollema 2nd overall. However, in the last week, Ten Dam struggled to stay with the general classification contenders making him slip out of the top ten, finishing 13th overall.

At the 2014 Tour de France, Ten Dam was selected to lead  with Mollema. Through the Vosges on stages 9 and 10 Ten Dam was already almost 8 minutes behind race leader, Vincenzo Nibali giving his leadership to Mollema. Ten Dam's form slowly improved as the race went through the Alps finishing 8th on stages 13 and 14. With his good form moving through the Pyrenees, Ten Dam managed to finish in the top 10 overall, finishing 9th.

Team Giant–Alpecin (2016–2018)

Retirement (2019-) 
Since his retirement, Ten Dam is able to spend more time with his family and life has become less regimented. However, he still had time for an interview with CyclingTips.com.

Ten Dam continues to give interviews and hold podcasts. One of his most interesting podcasts is about cycling and mental health together with Jack Thompson. Recently, Ten Dam started another podcast called the "Beter Worden Podcast" (Get Better) in which several aspects of improving on the bike are highlighted and discussed with a motion scientist.

In May 2021, ten Dam won Gravel Locos in Hico, Texas.

Achievements 

1999
 3rd Overall Flèche du Sud
2003
 1st La Marmotte 
2004
 9th Grote Prijs Stad Zottegem
2005
 3rd Overall Ster Elektrotoer
 3rd Omloop der Kempen
 4th Overall Tour of Belgium
 4th Overall Rheinland-Pfalz Rundfahrt
 8th Overall Tour de Luxembourg
 8th Kampioenschap van Vlaanderen
 9th Hel van het Mergelland
2006
 1st  Mountains classification Ster Elektrotoer
 5th Overall Four Days of Dunkirk
 7th Route Adélie
 7th Polynormande
 9th Overall Course de la Solidarité Olympique
1st Stage 2a (ITT)
2007
 5th Grand Prix d'Ouverture La Marseillaise
 7th Overall Deutschland Tour
 9th Overall Volta a Catalunya
2008
 5th Overall Critérium International
1st Stage 1
 10th Overall Tour de Suisse
2009
 1st  Mountains classification Tour de Romandie
 8th Overall Vuelta a Murcia
2010
 10th Overall Vuelta a Burgos
2011
 5th Overall Tour Down Under
 6th Overall Tour of California
 8th Overall Tour de Suisse
 10th Overall Vuelta a Castilla y León
2012
 1st Ridderronde Maastricht
 8th Overall Vuelta a España
 9th Brabantse Pijl
2013
 3rd Overall Tour du Haut Var
 8th Overall Tour of Norway
2014
 8th Overall Tour of California
 9th Overall Tour de France
2016
 10th Overall Tour of California
2021
 1st Gravel Locos 150
 2nd Garmin Unbound Gravel 200

General classification results timeline

Classics results timeline

Major championship results timeline

See also
 List of Dutch Olympic cyclists

References

External links 

 
 Team Sunweb profile
 
 

1980 births
Living people
Dutch male cyclists
Cyclists at the 2008 Summer Olympics
Olympic cyclists of the Netherlands
People from Bedum
UCI Road World Championships cyclists for the Netherlands
Cyclists from Groningen (province)